The 1951–52 season was the fiftieth season in which Dundee competed at a Scottish national level, playing in Division A, where the club would finish in 8th place.

Dundee would also compete in both the Scottish Cup and the Scottish League Cup. Dundee would find great success in the cups in this season, coming close to winning the double. After just barely qualifying out from the group stage, Dundee would make it to the League Cup Final where they would defeat Rangers by the score of 3–2, with captain Alf Boyd scoring a 90th-minute header from a Billy Steel free kick to secure the club's second major honour in its history, in front of a crowd of 92,325. Dundee would grace Hampden Park again for the Scottish Cup Final, but failed in their bid to win both cups in a comprehensive defeat to Motherwell. The attendance for this final is a Scottish record for any game not involving either of the Old Firm.

Scottish Division A 

Statistics provided by Dee Archive.

League table

Scottish League Cup 

Statistics provided by Dee Archive.

Group 3

Group 3 table

Knockout stage

Scottish Cup 

Statistics provided by Dee Archive.

Player Statistics 
Statistics provided by Dee Archive

|}

See also 

 List of Dundee F.C. seasons

References

External links 

 1951-52 Dundee season on Fitbastats

Dundee F.C. seasons
Dundee